The Ruf Turbo Florio is a two-seater sports car produced by German car manufacturer Ruf Automobile. It was unveiled at the 2015 Geneva Motor Show. The name of the car comes from the Targa Florio, a Sicilian road race after which Porsche's targa top cars are also named. The Turbo Florio is based on the Porsche 991 Targa 4 platform, with significant changes done to the body, engine, and structure of the car.

Specifications

Powertrain 
The engine is rear mounted and the car can be configured to have an all-wheel drive or a rear-wheel drive layout.

Transmission 
The Turbo Florio can be equipped with either Porsche's 7-speed PDK transmission or a 6-speed manual transmission.

Exterior features 
The exterior of the Turbo Florio features many aerodynamic and stylistic changes over the standard Porsche 991 targa. It has an elongated front splitter, air intake ducts on each rear fender, a rear diffuser and a duck tail spoiler on the rear of the car for optimised downforce. The car comes equipped with special 5-spoke Ruf alloy wheels.

Performance 

References

External links 
Ruf Turbo Florio official website

Rear-engined vehicles
Sports cars
Turbo Florio
Cars introduced in 2015
Cars powered by boxer engines